Xosé Castro Roig (born 19 November 1968 in A Coruña, Galicia, Spain) is a Galician translator and television presenter.

An autodidact, he specialized as an English-Spanish audiovisual and software translator.

He has collaborated with ElCastellano.org, a webpage for Spanish language. He is a member of the editorial staff of the medical translation magazine Panacea.

He is also a popular TV presenter, he entertains in language matters at Palabra por palabra.

References

External links
 Mom, I want to be an artist!
 Lista de artículos de Xosé Castro Roig publicados en el Centro Virtual Cervantes
 "Solo ante el subtítulo. Experiencias de un subtitulador"
 Ponencia "Quién puede traducir películas, cómo y dónde"
 Perfil biográfico de Escolapios

1968 births
Living people
People from A Coruña
Galician translators
English–Spanish translators
Spanish television presenters